Cutthroat eels are a family, Synaphobranchidae, of eels, the only members of the suborder Synaphobranchoidei. They are found worldwide in temperate and tropical seas.

They are distinguished by the presence of telescopic eyes in the larvae. In some classifications (for example, ITIS), this family is split, with Simenchelys in its own family, the Simenchelyidae.

References